Tar Babies was an American band from Madison, Wisconsin, United States, that released several albums on SST Records. Critic Steve Huey of Allmusic describes them as a minor player on SST, with an intriguing sound rooted in hardcore punk but touching on "bits of psychedelia, jazz, and avant-noise skronk" and open-ended jamming reminiscent of George Clinton's P-Funk groups.

Biography
The Tar Babies formed in the early 1980s.  The original line up was Bucky Pope (guitar), Jeremy Davies (vocals), Robin Davies (bass), and Dan Bitney (drums).  Jeremy Davies and Dan Bitney had previously played in the hardcore band Mecht Mensch (where Bitney played guitar and Davies played bass), while Bucky Pope and Robin Davies had been members of the Bloody Mattresses.  This line up recorded 1983's "Face The Music" and 1985's "Respect Your Nightmares", both of which were released on their own Bone Air Records and were compiled from sessions produced by Butch Vig and Bob Mould.  In 1987, the group recorded "Fried Milk", their first release for SST Records.  By this time, Jeremy Davies had left the band and vocals were handled by Bucky, Dan and Robin.  1988's "No Contest" and 1989's "Honey Bubble" showed an increasing funk influence and included Tony Jarvis on saxophone.  Robin Davies left the group between the two albums and was replaced by Steve Lewis.  The Tar Babies split after "Honey Bubble" but in 1992 Pope, Bitney, and Lewis regrouped with 2nd guitarist Bobby Vienneau released "Death Trip" on the German label Sonic Noise.  They split for good afterwards.

In the early 2000s, Bucky Pope and Robin Davies reunited under the moniker the Bar Tabbies. Dan Bitney has been a longtime member of Chicago's Tortoise. Bucky Pope's current band (circa 2014) is Negative Example.

Discography
Face The Music 12" EP (Bone Air, 1983)
Respect Your Nightmares 12" EP (Bone Air, 1985)
Fried Milk LP (SST Records, 1987)
No Contest LP (SST Records, 1988)
Honey Bubble LP (SST Records, 1989)
Death Trip LP (Sonic Noise, 1992)
Face The Music/Respect Your Nightmares CD compilation (Lexicon Devil, 2005)

Members

Final Line Up
Bucky Pope - Vocals, Guitar
Bobby Vienneau - Guitar
Steve Lewis - Bass
Dan Bitney - Drums

Former Members
Jeremy Davies - Vocals
Robin Davies - Bass, Vocals
Tony Jarvis - Saxophone

References

External links
 Tar Babies Band Site
 discography at music.aol.com
 
Coley, Byron "Tar Babies", Trouser Press

Punk rock groups from Wisconsin
Musical groups established in 1982